Levi Lloyd Francis (born 4 September 2003) is an English professional footballer who plays as a defender for Slimbridge.

Career
Francis started his career with Swindon Town, making his first-team debut during an EFL Trophy second round tie in November 2021 against Colchester United, featuring for 57 minutes in the 2–1 defeat which saw the Robins exit the competition.

On 25 March 2022, Francis along with team-mate, Callum Winchcombe joined National League South side, Chippenham Town on work experience loans for the remainder of the 2021–22 campaign.

On 9 July 2022, Francis joined Slimbridge

Career statistics

References

External links

2003 births
Living people
English footballers
Association football defenders
Swindon Town F.C. players
Chippenham Town F.C. players
English Football League players